Bells of Rosarita  is a 1945 American musical Western film starring Roy Rogers and directed by Frank McDonald.

Plot
Cowboy balladeer Roy Rogers meets Sue Farnum (Dale Evans), a girl returning from back East, who is cheated out of her inheritance by a greedy scoundrel and kidnapper named Ripley (Grant Withers). As if things weren't bad enough, Roy's friend, ranch-owner Gabby Whitaker (Gabby Hayes), has misplaced his title papers. Normally, this wouldn't matter, but since that villain, Ripley, files suit claiming ownership of the ranch, it does. Not only that, but he's got an air-tight case. Roy sets out to expose Ripley, win back Sue's money and locate Gabby's title papers.

Cast
Roy Rogers as Roy Rogers
Trigger as Trigger, Roy's Horse
George 'Gabby' Hayes as "Gabby" Whittaker
Dale Evans as Sue Farnum
Adele Mara as Patty Phillips
Grant Withers as William Ripley
Addison Richards as Slim Phillips
Roy Barcroft as Henchman Maxwell
Janet Martin as Rosarita
The Robert Mitchell Boy Choir as Boys choir
Bob Nolan as Bob Nolan, Band Leader
Sons of the Pioneers as Musicians
Bill Elliott as Wild Bill Elliott
Allan Lane as Allan Lane
Don 'Red' Barry as Don Barry
Robert Livingston as Bob Livingston
Sunset Carson as Sunset Carson

Soundtrack
 Roy Rogers, Dale Evans, Sons of the Pioneers and later reprised by cast - "Bells of Rosarita" (Written by John Elliott as Jack Elliott)
 Robert Mitchell Boys' Choir - "Bugler's Lullaby" (Written by Robert Mitchell and Betty Best)
 Bob Nolan and the Sons of the Pioneers - "Trail Herdin' Cowboy" (Written by Bob Nolan)
 Adele Mara (dancing) - "Aloha"
 Roy Rogers and the Sons of the Pioneers - "I'm Going To Build a Big Fence Around Texas" (Written by Cliff Friend, Katherine Phillips and George Olsen)
 Roy Rogers and the Sons of the Pioneers - "When the Circus Comes To Town" (Written by Jerry Eaton and Terry Shand)
 "Singing Down the Road" (Music by Raymond Scott, lyrics by Charles Tobias)
 "Michael Finnegan"
 Dale Evans - "Under a Blanket of Blue" (Written by Jerry Livingston, Marty Symes and Al Neiburg as Al J. Neiburg)

References

External links

1945 films
1940s Western (genre) musical films
1940s English-language films
American black-and-white films
Republic Pictures films
Films directed by Frank McDonald
American Western (genre) musical films
1940s American films